Rengsjö is a locality situated in Bollnäs Municipality, Gävleborg County, Sweden with 264 inhabitants in 2010.

Sports
The following sports clubs are located in Rengsjö:

 Rengsjö SK

References 

Populated places in Bollnäs Municipality
Hälsingland